Kirejtomma is an extinct genus of ommatid beetle, known from the early Late Cretaceous (Cenomanian) aged Burmese amber of Myanmar. The type and only known species K. zhengi was described in 2020 as a species of Clessidromma, and placed into the new genus in 2021.

References 

Ommatidae
Burmese amber
Fossil taxa described in 2020
Prehistoric beetle genera